Ovidiopol Raion was a raion (district) in Odesa Oblast of Ukraine. Its administrative center was the urban-type settlement of Ovidiopol. The raion was abolished and its territory was merged into Odesa Raion on 18 July 2020 as part of the administrative reform of Ukraine, which reduced the number of raions of Odesa Oblast to seven. The area of Ovidiopol Raion was merged into Odesa Raion. The last estimate of the raion population was  

The population of the district was 60,308 in 2001. According to the 2001 Ukrainian census the population was 79% Ukrainian, 15% Russian, 2% Moldovan, 1% Bulgarian, and 1% Belarusian.

The shore of the Black Sea formed the southeastern edge of the district and the shore of the Dniester Estuary formed the southwestern edge.

References

External links
  Ovidiopolskyi Raion
  Ovidiopolskyi Raion
  Ovidiopolsky area
  Ovidiopolsky area

Former raions of Odesa Oblast
1924 establishments in Ukraine
Ukrainian raions abolished during the 2020 administrative reform